Podgaje may refer to the following places:
Podgaje, Greater Poland Voivodeship (west-central Poland)
Podgaje, Busko County in Świętokrzyskie Voivodeship (south-central Poland)
Podgaje, Kazimierza County in Świętokrzyskie Voivodeship (south-central Poland)